Mannophryne oblitterata is a species of frog in the family Aromobatidae.
It is endemic to Venezuela.
Its natural habitats are subtropical or tropical moist lowland forest and rivers.
It is threatened by habitat loss.

References

oblitterata
Amphibians of Venezuela
Endemic fauna of Venezuela
Taxonomy articles created by Polbot